The 2007 Detroit Tigers season was the team's 107th season and its 8th at Comerica Park.  The season ended with the 88-74 Tigers finishing runner-up in the AL Central Division, eight games in back of the AL Central Champion Cleveland Indians. They failed in winning the Wild Card, a task which they achieved in 2006, and going on to win the AL Pennant.

After a trip to the 2006 World Series that ended with a defeat to the St. Louis Cardinals, the Tigers started the offseason by trading pitchers Humberto Sánchez, Kevin Whelan, and Anthony Claggett to the New York Yankees for outfielder and designated hitter Gary Sheffield.  Plus, they re-signed players from the previous season's team; first baseman Sean Casey, second baseman Omar Infante, outfielder Craig Monroe, left-handed starting pitcher Nate Robertson, and right-handed relief pitcher Fernando Rodney all returned with the Tigers for the 2007 season.

Regular season
As of July 18, the Tigers had sold 2,712,393 tickets at Comerica Park for the 2007 season, setting a new single-season home attendance record for the team. The previous record had been 2,704,794 customers at Tiger Stadium in 1984. At the end of the season, the Tigers had sold over 3,000,000 tickets for 2007.

Season standings

Record vs. opponents

Roster

Season Highlights
 On June 12, Pitcher Justin Verlander threw a no-hitter against the Milwaukee Brewers, winning the game 4-0.  This was the first no-hitter by a Tiger since Jack Morris did it in 1984 and the first ever thrown at Comerica Park.
 Five players, second only to Boston's six, represented Detroit in the 2007 MLB All-Star Game.  Carlos Guillén, Magglio Ordóñez, Plácido Polanco, Iván Rodríguez and Justin Verlander joined American League manager Jim Leyland in the All-Star game.
 On July 6, Neifi Pérez was suspended 25 games by MLB for a second positive test for a banned stimulant.  He subsequently tested positive for a third time and was suspended on August 3 for 80 games.
 On August 17, highly touted prospect Cameron Maybin made his major league debut in New York City against the Yankees playing left-field.

Curtis Granderson
 On August 7, 2007, Granderson became only the second player in franchise history to have at least 30 doubles, 15 triples, 15 home runs, and 10 stolen bases in a single season when he hit a double in a game against the Tampa Bay Devil Rays.  The other Tiger to accomplish this feat was Charlie Gehringer in 1930. Granderson hit his second inside-the-park home run in his first at bat against the Yankees on August 26, 2007.
 On September 7, 2007, Granderson became the 6th member all-time of baseball's exclusive 20–20–20 club. Granderson joined the 20–20–20 club with Kansas City's George Brett (1979), Willie Mays of the New York Giants (1957), Cleveland's Jeff Heath (1941), St. Louis' Jim Bottomley (1928), and Frank Schulte of the Chicago Cubs (1911).
 On September 9, 2007 Granderson stole his 20th base of the season and joined Willie Mays and Frank "Wildfire" Schulte as the only players in major league history to reach 20 doubles, 20 triples, 20 home runs, and 20 stolen bases in a season. Schulte was the first to accomplish the feat in 1911 while playing for the Chicago Cubs and Mays did it in 1957 with the New York Giants. Jimmy Rollins of the Philadelphia Phillies would later that year accomplish the same feat.

Magglio Ordóñez
Magglio Ordóñez had one of the best season by a Detroit Tiger batter in the past 60 years.  Magglio's records and accomplishments in 2007 include:
 His .363 batting average was the highest in Major League Baseball.  He finished the season as the AL batting champion, and is the first Tiger player to accomplish the feat since Norm Cash in 1961. The last Tiger to hit for a higher average was Charlie Gehringer in 1937.
 His 54 doubles was the most in Major League Baseball. It is the most by a Tiger since George Kell hit 56 in 1950.
 His 139 RBIs was the highest by a Tiger since Rocky Colavito had 140 in 1961.  Colavito is the only Tiger batter with more RBIs than Ordóñez in the past 60 years.
 On August 12, 2007, Magglio hit two home runs in an eight-run second-inning of an 11-6 win over the Oakland Athletics, becoming the second batter in Tigers' history to achieve this feat; Al Kaline had done so on April 17, 1955, in a 16-0 win over the then-Kansas City Athletics.
 Ordóñez had an on-base percentage of .434.  Only two other Tiger batters in the past 60 years have hit for a higher on-base percentage: Tony Phillips in 1993 (.443) and Norm Cash in 1961 (.487).
 Only one Tiger in the past 60 years has had a higher slugging percentage than Magglio's .595: Norm Cash in 1961 had a slugging percentage of .662.
The one Tiger hitting season in the past 60 years that exceeds Ordonez's 2007 season is that of Norm Cash in 1961.  In 1961, the AL MVP award was given to New York Yankee slugger Roger Maris who hit 61 home runs.

2007–08 offseason events
On October 9, 2007, the Tigers announced that they were picking up the $13 million, fifth-year option on Iván Rodríguez's contract, keeping him on the roster through at least the 2008 season. The Tigers could have bought out the option for $3 million and allowed him to become a free agent.

On October 10, the Tigers returned Rule 5 draftee Edward Campusano to the Chicago Cubs.  Campusano spent the entire 2007 season on the 60-day disabled list.

Relief pitcher Joel Zumaya was injured while at his off-season home in California.  While moving boxes during the October 2007 California wildfires, a large box fell on Zumaya, separating his shoulder.  Zumaya had surgery to correct the problem and is currently rehabilitating the shoulder.

On October 29, first baseman Sean Casey filed for free agency, on the first day players could do so.  The team's management had already informed Casey that he would not return to the lineup the following season. The same day, the Tigers acquired shortstop Édgar Rentería from the Atlanta Braves, in exchange for pitching prospect Jair Jurrjens and outfielding prospect Gorkys Hernández.  The move paves the way for current shortstop Carlos Guillén to move to the vacant spot at first base.

On October 30, utility infielder Neifi Pérez filed for free agency.  He had not played since July 5 after being suspended for violating the league's performance-enhancing drug policy.

On November 12, veteran closer Todd Jones was re-signed to a one-year, $7 million contract. The same day, the Tigers received outfielder Jacque Jones in a trade with the Chicago Cubs for utility man Omar Infante.

On November 30, Kenny Rogers agreed to a one-year, 8-million contract to return to the Tigers.  Rogers represented himself in contract negotiations after firing agent Scott Boras on November 17.  The contract contains performance bonuses based on how many innings Rogers pitches in 2008.  The team also signed free-agent pitcher Francisco Cruceta to a one-year deal.

On December 5, the Tigers pulled off a blockbuster trade with the Florida Marlins, with starting pitcher Dontrelle Willis and third-baseman Miguel Cabrera arriving from Florida.  The Tigers send in exchange backup catcher Mike Rabelo, top outfielding prospect Cameron Maybin, top pitching prospect Andrew Miller, and three other minor leaguers.  The same day, the Tigers swapped pitchers with the Colorado Rockies, acquiring Denny Bautista for prospect José Capellán.  Also, the Tigers sent minor-league slugger Chris Shelton to Texas for outfielder Freddy Guzman.

The Cabrera trade would make current third-baseman Brandon Inge expendable.  Inge asked management for a trade, but the team was unable to make a deal.  Inge's four-year, $24 million contract, signed before the 2007 season, was partly to blame.  Inge would eventually drop the matter and accept the role as a utilityman.

On December 6, the Tigers selected minor-league pitchers Juan Cedeño from the Washington organization and Ben Fritz from the Oakland organization in the Rule 5 draft.  The Tigers lost minor-league pitchers Randor Bierd, Corey Hamman and Jose Fragoso.

On December 29, the Tigers and Dontrelle Willis signed a three-year, $29 million contract extension.

On January 16, 2008, the Tigers avoided arbitration with Nate Robertson and signed him to a three-year, $21.25 million contract.  He would have been a free agent after the 2009 season.  The following day, the Tigers avoided arbitration with outfielder Marcus Thames, signing him to a one-year, $1,275,000 contract.  On the 18th, the team was able to avoid arbitration with all of their eligible players by signing Miguel Cabrera to a one-year, $11.3 million contract.  Reliever Bobby Seay was given a one-year, $780,000 contract.

On February 4, center fielder Curtis Granderson signed a 5-year, $30.25 million contract extension, keeping the speedy lead-off man on the roster through at least 2012.  There is a team option for 2013.

On February 5, the Tigers completed another trade with the Texas Rangers, sending Class A Lakeland and Class AA Erie outfielder Michael Hernandez in exchange for minor league right-hander Armando Galarraga.

On March 25, the Tigers finalized a long-term contract for Miguel Cabrera.  Cabrera signed an eight-year, $152.3 million deal, which is the biggest in Detroit Tigers history.

Game log

|- style="background-color:#ffbbbb"
| 1 || April 2 || Blue Jays || 5 – 3  || Frasor (1-0) || Rodney (0-1) || Ryan (1) || 44,297 || 0-1
|- style="background-color:#bbffbb"
| 2 || April 4 || Blue Jays|| 10 – 9 || Robertson (1-0) || Burnett (0-1) || Jones (1) || 24,881 || 1-1
|- style="background-color:#bbbbbb"
| -- || April 5 || Blue Jays || colspan=5|Postponed (cold weather)  || 1-1
|- style="background-color:#ffbbbb"
| 3 || April 6 || @ Royals || 3 – 1 || de la Rosa (1-0) || Mesa (0-1) || Riske (1) || 13,330 || 1-2
|- style="background-color:#bbffbb"
| 4 || April 7 || @ Royals || 6 – 5 || Maroth (1-0) || Meche (1-1) || Jones (2) || 13,899 || 2-2
|- style="background-color:#bbffbb"
| 5 || April 8 || @ Royals || 3 – 2 || Rodney (1-1) || Riske (0-1) || Jones (3)|| 13,109 || 3-2
|- style="background-color:#ffbbbb"
| 6 || April 9 || @ Orioles || 6 – 2 || Cabrera (1-1) || Durbin (0-1) || || 48,159 || 3-3
|- style="background-color:#bbffbb"
| 7 || April 10 || @ Orioles || 3 – 1 ||Robertson (2-0) ||Wright (0-2) ||Jones (4)||18,594 || 4-3
|- style="background-color:#bbffbb"
| 8 || April 11 || @ Orioles || 4 – 1  ||Ledezma (1-0) ||Birkins (0-1) ||Jones (5) ||13,288 || 5-3
|- style="background-color:#bbffbb"
| 9 || April 12 || @ Blue Jays || 5 – 4 || Maroth (2-0) || Ohka (0-1) || Zumaya (1) || 20,416 || 6-3
|- style="background-color:#ffbbbb"
| 10 || April 13 || @ Blue Jays || 2 – 1  || Halladay (2-0) || Rodney (1-2) || || 26,268|| 6-4
|- style="background-color:#bbffbb"
| 11 || April 14 || @ Blue Jays || 10 – 7 || Ledezma (2-0) || Ryan (0-2) || Jones (6) || 28,203 || 7-4
|- style="background-color:#ffbbbb"
| 12 || April 15 || @ Blue Jays || 2 – 1 || Towers (1-1) || Robertson (2-1) || Marcum (1) || 25,983 || 7-5
|- style="background-color:#bbffbb"
| 13 || April 16 || Royals || 12 – 5 || Verlander (1-0) || Greinke (1-2) || || 21,832 || 8-5
|- style="background-color:#bbffbb"
| 14 || April 17 || Royals || 7 – 6 || Ledezma (3-0) || Riske (0-2) || Jones (7) || 21,263 || 9-5
|- style="background-color:#ffbbbb"
| 15 || April 18 || Royals || 4 – 3  ||Soria (1-0)||Rodney (1-3) || || 27,945 || 9-6
|- style="background-color:#ffbbbb"
| 16 || April 20 || White Sox || 5 – 4 || Masset (1-0) || Grilli (0-1) || Jenks (5) || 40,685 || 9-7
|- style="background-color:#ffbbbb"
| 17 || April 21 || White Sox || 7 – 5  || Aardsma (2-0)|| Rodney (1-4) || Jenks (6) || 39,618 || 9-8
|- style="background-color:#bbffbb"
| 18 || April 22 || White Sox || 6 – 5  ||  Grilli (1-1) || Masset (1-1) || || 38,379 || 10-8
|- style="background-color:#bbffbb"
| 19 || April 23 || @ Angels || 9 – 5 || Grilli (2-1) ||Weaver (0-2) || ||40,563 ||11-8
|- style="background-color:#ffbbbb"
| 20 || April 24 || @ Angels || 9 – 8  ||Moseley (2-0) ||Jones (0-1) || ||36,055 ||11-9
|- style="background-color:#bbffbb"
| 21 || April 25 || @ White Sox || 6 – 2 || Durbin (1-1) || Danks (0-3) || || 26,342 || 12-9
|- style="background-color:#bbbbbb"
| -- || April 26 || @ White Sox || colspan=5|Postponed (rain)  || 12-9
|- style="background-color:#ffbbbb"
| 22 || April 27 || Twins || 5 – 3 || Crain (1-1)||Zumaya (0-1)||Nathan (7) || 31,147 ||12-10
|- style="background-color:#ffbbbb"
| 23 || April 28 || Twins || 11 – 3 || Silva (2-1) || Verlander (1-1) || || 39,547 || 12-11
|- style="background-color:#bbffbb"
| 24 || April 29 || Twins || 4 – 3 ||Jones (1-1) ||Crain (1-2) || || 36,483 || 13-11
|- style="background-color:#bbffbb"
| 25 || April 30 || Orioles || 8 – 4 || Bonderman (1-0) || Cabrera (1-3)|| Rodney (1) || 24,914 || 14-11

|- style="background-color:#bbffbb"
| 26 || May 1 || Orioles || 5 – 4 ||Zumaya (1-1) || Báez (0-1) || Jones (9) || 23,126 || 15-11
|- style="background-color:#bbffbb"
| 27 || May 2 || Orioles || 3 – 2 || Robertson (3-1) ||Trachsel (1-3) || Jones (10) ||29,278 || 16-11
|- style="background-color:#bbffbb"
| 28 || May 4 || @ Royals || 6 – 3 || Verlander (2-1) || Bannister (0-2) || Jones (11) || 17,614 || 17-11
|- style="background-color:#bbffbb"
| 29 || May 5 || @ Royals || 7 – 5 || Mesa (1-1) || Duckworth (0-2)  || Jones (12) || 26,070 || 18-11
|- style="background-color:#bbffbb"
| 30 || May 6 || @ Royals || 13 – 4 || Durbin (2-1) || Greinke (1-4) || || 17,034 || 19-11
|- style="background-color:#bbffbb"
| 31 || May 8 || Mariners || 9 – 7 || Bonderman (2-0) || Ramírez (2-2) || Jones (13) || 30,171 || 20-11
|- style="background-color:#ffbbbb"
| 32 || May 9 || Mariners || 9 – 2 || Baek (1-0) || Robertson (3-2) || || 27,377 || 20-12
|- style="background-color:#bbffbb"
| 33 || May 10 || Mariners || 7 – 3 ||Verlander (3-1) || Weaver (0-6) || || 37,359 || 21-12
|- style="background-color:#bbffbb"
| 34 || May 11 || @ Twins || 7 – 3 || Maroth (3-0) || Santana (4-3) || || 31,458 || 22-12
|- style="background-color:#bbffbb"
| 35 || May 12 || @ Twins || 8 – 2 || Durbin (3-1) || Ponson (2-5) || || 32,176 || 23-12
|- style="background-color:#ffbbbb"
| 36 || May 13 || @ Twins || 16 – 4 || Bonser (1-1) || Vasquez (0-1)|| || 25,037 || 23-13
|- style="background-color:#ffbbbb"
| 37 || May 14 || @ Red Sox || 7 – 1 || Matsuzaka (5-2) || Robertson (3-3) || || 36,935 || 23-14
|- style="background-color:#bbffbb"
| 38 || May 15 || @ Red Sox || 7 – 2 || Verlander (4-1) || Wakefield (4-4) || || 37,031 || 24-14
|- style="background-color:#bbbbbb"
| -- || May 16 || @ Red Sox || colspan=5|Postponed (rain)  || 24-14
|- style="background-color:#ffbbbb"
| 39 || May 17 || @ Red Sox || 2 – 1 || Tavárez (2-4) || Miner (0-1) || Papelbon (11) || 36,767 ||24-15
|- style="background-color:#ffbbbb"
| 40 || May 17 || @ Red Sox || 4 – 2 || Donnelly (2-1) || Ledezma (3-2) || Okajima (2) || 37,006 || 24-16
|- style="background-color:#bbffbb"
| 41 || May 18 || Cardinals || 14 – 4 || Miller (1-0) || Looper (5-3) || || 40,816 ||25-16
|- style="background-color:#bbffbb"
| 42 || May 19 || Cardinals || 8 – 7 || Robertson (4-3)|| Reyes (0-7) || Jones (14) || 42,625 || 26-16
|- style="background-color:#bbffbb"
| 43 || May 20 || Cardinals  || 6 – 3 || Verlander (5-1) || Thompson (2-1) || Seay (1) || 39,562 || 27-16
|- style="background-color:#ffbbbb"
| 44 || May 22 || Angels || 6 – 3 || Lackey (7-3) || Maroth (3-1) || Rodríguez (14) || 28,678 || 27-17
|- style="background-color:#bbffbb"
| 45 || May 23 || Angels || 8 – 7 || Durbin (4-1) || Colón (5-1) || Jones (15) || 28,105 || 28-17
|- style="background-color:#bbffbb"
| 46 || May 24 || Angels || 12 – 0 || Bonderman (3-0) || Santana (3-6) || || 36,048 || 29-17
|- style="background-color:#ffbbbb"
| 47 || May 25 || Indians || 7 – 4 || Byrd (5-1) || Robertson (4-4) || Borowski (15) || 40,074 || 29-18
|- style="background-color:#ffbbbb"
| 48 || May 26 || Indians || 6 – 3 || Sabathia (7-1) || Grilli (2-2) || Borowski (16) || 40,375 || 29-19
|- style="background-color:#ffbbbb"
| 49 || May 27 || Indians || 5 – 3 || Carmona (6-1) || Maroth (3-2) || Borowski (17) || 40,723 || 29-20
|- style="background-color:#ffbbbb"
| 50 || May 28 || @ Devil Rays || 6 – 5 || Glover (2-2) || Jones (1-2) || || 14,769 || 29-21
|- style="background-color:#bbffbb"
| 51 || May 29 || @ Devil Rays || 14 – 2 || Bonderman (4-0) || Fossum (3-5) || || 11,518 || 30-21
|- style="background-color:#ffbbbb"
| 52 || May 30 || @ Devil Rays || 5 – 3 || Shields (4-0) || Robertson (4-5) || || 12,435 || 30-22
|- style="background-color:#ffbbbb"
| 53 || May 31 || @ Indians || 11 – 5 || Sabathia (8-1)  || Verlander (5-2) || || 30,038 || 30-23

|- style="background-color:#ffbbbb"
| 54 || June 1 || @ Indians  || 12 – 11 || Hernández (1-3) || Jones (1-3) || || 41,365 || 30-24
|- style="background-color:#bbffbb"
| 55 || June 2 || @ Indians  || 9 – 5 || Durbin (5-1) || Lee (2-3) || || 38,254 || 31-24
|- style="background-color:#bbffbb"
| 56 || June 3 || @ Indians  || 9 – 2 || Bonderman (5-0) || Sowers (1-6) || || 30,268 || 32-24
|- style="background-color:#ffbbbb"
| 57 || June 5 || @ Rangers || 7 – 4 || Eyre (2-2) || Robertson (4-6) || Gagné (5) || 32,003 || 32-25
|- style="background-color:#bbffbb"
| 58 || June 6 || @ Rangers || 10 – 0 || Verlander (6-2) || Millwood (2-5) || || 28,795 || 33-25
|- style="background-color:#bbffbb"
| 59 || June 7 || @ Rangers || 11 – 4 || Maroth (4-2) || Loe (1-6) || || 22,990 || 34-25
|- style="background-color:#ffbbbb"
| 60 || June 8 || Mets || 3 – 0 || Sosa (6-1) || Durbin (5-2) || Wagner (14) || 42,007 || 34-26
|- style="background-color:#bbffbb"
| 61 || June 9 || Mets || 8 – 7 || Bonderman (6-0) || Pérez (6-5) || Jones (16) || 42,364 || 35-26
|- style="background-color:#bbffbb"
| 62 || June 10 || Mets || 15 – 7 || Miller (2-0) || Glavine (5-4) || || 40,914 || 36-26
|- style="background-color:#bbffbb"
| 63 || June 12 || Brewers || 4 – 0 || Verlander (7-2) || Suppan (7-7) || || 33,555 || 37-26
|- style="background-color:#ffbbbb"
| 64 || June 13 || Brewers || 3 – 2 || Spurling (1-0) || Rodney (1-5) || Cordero (23) || 37,593 || 37-27
|- style="background-color:#ffbbbb"
| 65 || June 14 || Brewers || 6 – 5 || Sheets (7-3) || Durbin (5-3) || Cordero (24) || 41,390 || 37-28
|- style="background-color:#bbffbb"
| 66 || June 15 || @ Phillies || 12 – 8 || Bonderman (7-0) || Lieber (3-5) || || 42,719 || 38-28
|- style="background-color:#ffbbbb"
| 67 || June 16 || @ Phillies || 6 – 3 || Moyer (6-5) || Miller (2-1) ||  || 45,102 ||38-29
|- style="background-color:#bbffbb"
| 68 || June 17 || @ Phillies || 7 – 4 || Verlander (8-2) || Geary (1-2) || Jones (17) || 45,537 || 39-29
|- style="background-color:#bbffbb"
| 69 || June 18 || @ Nationals || 9 – 8 || Maroth (5-2) || Chico (3-5) || || 22,562 || 40-29
|- style="background-color:#bbffbb"
| 70 || June 19 || @ Nationals || 15 – 1 || Durbin (6-3) || Simontacchi (4-5) || || 22,227 || 41-29
|- style="background-color:#bbffbb"
| 71 || June 20 || @ Nationals || 8 – 4 || Bonderman (8-0) || Rivera (1-2) || || 26,637 || 42-29
|- style="background-color:#bbffbb"
| 72 || June 22 || @ Braves || 5 – 0 || Rogers (1-0) || Smoltz (8-4) || || 44,034 || 43-29
|- style="background-color:#bbffbb"
| 73 || June 23 || @ Braves || 2 – 1 || Verlander (9-2) || Davies (3-7) || Jones (18) || 49,074 || 44-29
|- style="background-color:#bbffbb"
| 74 || June 24 || @ Braves || 5 – 0 || Miller (3-1) || James (6-7) || Durbin (1) || 34,181 || 45-29
|- style="background-color:#ffbbbb"
| 75 || June 25 || Rangers || 8 – 3 || Loe (4-6) || Bonderman (8-1) || || 36,330 || 45-30
|- style="background-color:#ffbbbb"
| 76 || June 26 || Rangers || 9 – 6 || Otsuka (2-1) || Jones (1-4) || Gagné (8) || 39,709 || 45-31
|- style="background-color:#bbbbbb"
| -- || June 27 || Rangers || colspan=5|Postponed (rain)  || 45-31
|- style="background-color:#bbffbb"
| 77 || June 28 || Rangers || 5 – 2 || Rogers (2-0)|| Millwood (4-7) || Jones (19) || 37,253 || 46-31
|- style="background-color:#ffbbbb"
| 78 || June 29 || Twins || 11 – 1 || Santana (9-6) || Verlander (9-3) || || 42,361 || 46-32
|- style="background-color:#ffbbbb"
| 79 || June 30 || Twins || 8 – 5 || Slowey (3-0) || Miller (3-2) || Nathan (16) || 41,588 || 46-33

|- style="background-color:#bbffbb"
| 80 || July 1 || Twins || 1 – 0 || Bonderman (9-1) || Baker (2-3) || Jones (20) || 41,078 || 47-33
|- style="background-color:#ffbbbb"
| 81 || July 3 || Indians || 5 – 4 || Mastny (6-2) || Capellán (0-3) || Borowski (25) || 40,741 || 47-34
|- style="background-color:#bbffbb"
| 82 || July 4 || Indians || 6 – 4 || Rogers (3-0) || Westbrook (1-4) || Jones (21) || 40,782 || 48-34
|- style="background-color:#bbffbb"
| 83 || July 5 || Indians || 12 – 3 || Verlander (10-3) || Sabathia (12-3) || || 40,923 || 49-34
|- style="background-color:#bbffbb"
| 84 || July 6 || Red Sox || 9 – 2 || Miller (4-2) || Tavárez (5-7) || || 43,839 || 50-34
|- style="background-color:#bbffbb"
| 85 || July 7 || Red Sox || 3 – 2  || Grilli (3-2) || Papelbon (0-2) || || 44,193 || 51-34
|- style="background-color:#bbffbb"
| 86 || July 8 || Red Sox || 6 – 5 || Robertson (5-6) || Matsuzaka (10-6) || Jones (22) || 41,943 || 52-34
|- style="background-color:#ffbbbb"
| 87 || July 12 || @ Mariners || 3 – 2 || Hernández (6-4) || Miller (4-3) || Putz (25) || 31,994 || 52-35
|- style="background-color:#bbffbb"
| 88 || July 13 || @ Mariners || 6 – 3 || Bonderman (10-1) || Washburn (8-7) || Jones (23) || 37,393 || 53-35
|- style="background-color:#ffbbbb"
| 89 || July 14 || @ Mariners || 6 – 4 || Batista (9-7) || Rogers (3-1) || Putz (26) || 38,202 || 53-36
|- style="background-color:#bbffbb"
| 90 || July 15 || @ Mariners || 11 – 7 || Verlander (11-3) || Weaver (2-7) || || 39,073 || 54-36
|- style="background-color:#bbffbb"
| 91 || July 17 || @ Twins || 1 – 0 || Robertson (6-6) || Garza (1-1) || Jones (24) || 30,939 || 55-36
|- style="background-color:#bbffbb"
| 92 || July 18 || @ Twins || 3 – 2 || Miller (5-3) || Santana (10-7) || Jones (25) || 38,070 || 56-36
|- style="background-color:#bbffbb"
| 93 || July 19 || @ Twins || 4 – 3  || Miner (1-1) || Nathan (3-2) || Jones (26) || 36,551 || 57-36
|- style="background-color:#ffbbbb"
| 94 || July 20 || Royals || 10 – 2 || Meche (7-6) || Rogers (3-2) || || 43,200 || 57-37
|- style="background-color:#bbffbb"
| 95 || July 21 || Royals || 10 – 8  || Durbin (7-3) || Soria (1-3) || || 43,408 || 58-37
|- style="background-color:#ffbbbb"
| 96 || July 22 || Royals || 5 – 2 || Bannister (6-6) || Robertson (6-7) || || 42,201 || 58-38
|- style="background-color:#bbffbb"
| 97 || July 23 || @ White Sox || 9 – 6 || Grilli (4-2) || Buehrle (7-6) || Jones (27) || 30,122 || 59-38
|- style="background-color:#ffbbbb"
| 98 || July 24 || @ White Sox  || 5 – 3 || Vázquez (8-5) || Bonderman (10-2) || Jenks (27) || 30,569 || 59-39
|- style="background-color:#ffbbbb"
| 99 || July 24 || @ White Sox || 8 – 7 || Thornton (3-3) || Miner (1-2) || Jenks (28) || 29,042 || 59-40
|- style="background-color:#bbffbb"
| 100 || July 25 || @ White Sox || 13 – 9 || Grilli (5-2) || Contreras (5-13) || Byrdak (1) || 28,462 || 60-40
|- style="background-color:#ffbbbb"
| 101 || July 26 || @ White Sox || 4 – 3 || Jenks (3-4) || Miner (1-3) || || 30,567 || 60-41
|- style="background-color:#ffbbbb"
| 102 || July 27 || @ Angels || 11 – 6 || Weaver (7-5) || Robertson (6-8) || || 44,042 || 60-42
|- style="background-color:#ffbbbb"
| 103 || July 28 || @ Angels || 10 – 3 || Shields (3-3) || Grilli (5-3) || || 43,122 || 60-43
|- style="background-color:#ffbbbb"
| 104 || July 29 || @ Angels || 13 – 4 || Bootcheck (3-2) || Bonderman (10-3) || || 44,019 || 60-44
|- style="background-color:#bbffbb"
| 105 || July 30 || @ Athletics || 5 – 2 || Tata (1-0) || Blanton (8-8) || Jones (28)||  18,468 || 61-44
|- style="background-color:#ffbbbb"
| 106 || July 31 || @ Athletics || 7 – 3 || Haren (13-3) || Verlander (11-4) || || 21,305 || 61-45

|- style="background-color:#ffbbbb"
| 107 || August 1 || @ Athletics || 3 – 2 || Brown (1-0) || Robertson (6-9) || Embree (12) || 27,118 || 61-46
|- style="background-color:#ffbbbb"
| 108 || August 3 || White Sox || 7 – 4 || Buehrle (9-6) || Miller (5-4) || || 42,066 || 61-47
|- style="background-color:#ffbbbb"
| 109 || August 4 || White Sox || 7 – 5 || Vázquez (9-6) || Bonderman (10-4) || Jenks (31) || 42,907 || 61-48
|- style="background-color:#ffbbbb"
| 110 || August 5 || White Sox || 3 – 1 || Floyd (1-1) || Tata (1-1) || Jenks (32) || 39,778 || 61-49
|- style="background-color:#bbffbb"
| 111 || August 6 || @ Devil Rays || 6 – 4 || Miner (2-3) || Glover (5-4) || Jones (29) || 39,289 || 62-49
|- style="background-color:#bbffbb"
| 112 || August 7 || @ Devil Rays || 9 – 6 || Byrdak (1-0) || Wheeler (1-5) || Jones (30) || 35,288 || 63-49
|- style="background-color:#ffbbbb"
| 113 || August 8 || @ Devil Rays || 7 – 1 || Shields (9-7) || Durbin (7-4) || || 37,777 || 63-50
|- style="background-color:#ffbbbb"
| 114 || August 9 || @ Devil Rays || 8 – 1 || Kazmir (9-7) || Bonderman (10-5)  || || 38,789 || 63-51
|- style="background-color:#ffbbbb"
| 115 || August 10 || Athletics || 16 – 10 || Lugo (3-0) || McBride (1-1) || || 40,922 || 63-52
|- style="background-color:#bbffbb"
| 116 || August 11 || Athletics || 5 – 2 || Verlander (12-4) || Haren (13-4) || Jones (31) || 42,016 || 64-52
|- style="background-color:#bbffbb"
| 117 || August 12 || Athletics || 11 – 6 || Robertson (7-9) || Braden (1-7) || || 39,960 || 65-52
|- style="background-color:#ffbbbb"
| 118 || August 13 || Athletics || 7 – 2 || Gaudin (9-8) || Durbin (7-5) || || 37,229 || 65-53
|- style="background-color:#bbffbb"
| 119 || August 14 || @ Indians || 6 – 2  || Rodney (2-5) || Borowski (2-5) || || 37,570 || 66-53
|- style="background-color:#ffbbbb"
| 120 || August 15 || @ Indians || 5 – 2 || Carmona (14-7) || Jurrjens (0-1) || Borowski (33) || 39,250 || 66-54
|- style="background-color:#bbffbb"
| 121 || August 16 || @ Yankees || 8 – 5 || Verlander (13-4) || Mussina (8-8) || || 53,914 || 67-54
|- style="background-color:#ffbbbb"
| 122 || August 17 || @ Yankees || 6 – 1 || Pettitte (10-7) || Robertson (7-10) || || 54,290 || 67-55
|- style="background-color:#ffbbbb"
| 123 || August 18 || @ Yankees || 5 – 2 || Clemens (5-5) || Durbin (7-6) || Rivera (20) || 54,702 || 67-56
|- style="background-color:#ffbbbb"
| 124 || August 19 || @ Yankees || 9 – 3 || Wang (14-6) || Bonderman (10-6) || Ramirez (1) || 55,071 || 67-57
|- style="background-color:#bbffbb"
| 125 || August 21 || Indians || 2 – 1 || Jurrjens (1-1) || Carmona (14-8) || Jones (32) || 42,868 || 68-57
|- style="background-color:#ffbbbb"
| 126 || August 22 || Indians || 11 – 8 || Byrd (12-5) || Verlander (13-5) || Borowski (35) || 40,914 || 68-58
|- style="background-color:#ffbbbb"
| 127 || August 23 || Indians || 3 – 1  || Pérez (1-1) || Zumaya (1-2) || Borowski (36) || 40,946 || 68-59
|- style="background-color:#bbffbb"
| 128 || August 24 || Yankees || 9 – 6 || Durbin (8-6) || Henn (2-2) || || 44,163 || 69-59
|- style="background-color:#ffbbbb"
| 129 || August 25 || Yankees || 7 – 2 || Wang (15-6) || Bonderman (10-7) || || 44,250 || 69-60
|- style="background-color:#bbffbb"
| 130 || August 26 || Yankees || 5 – 4 || Seay (1-0) || Hughes (2-2) || Jones (33) || 43,268 || 70-60
|- style="background-color:#bbffbb"
| 131 || August 27 || Yankees || 16 – 0 || Verlander (14-5) || Mussina (8-10) || || 42,428 || 71-60
|- style="background-color:#ffbbbb"
| 132 || August 28 || @ Royals || 6 – 3 || Bannister (11-7) || Robertson (7-11) || || 16,193 || 71-61
|- style="background-color:#ffbbbb"
| 133 || August 29 || @ Royals || 5 – 0 || Braun (2-0) || Miller (5-5) || Riske (4) || 11,628 || 71-62
|- style="background-color:#bbffbb"
| 134 || August 30 || @ Royals || 6 – 1 || Bonderman (11-7) || Núñez (2-2) || || 11,196 || 72-62
|- style="background-color:#ffbbbb"
| 135 || August 31 || @ Athletics || 5 – 4  || Street (3-2) || Zumaya (1-3) || || 27,250 || 72-63

|- style="background-color:#bbffbb"
| 136 || September 1 || @ Athletics || 6 – 1 || Verlander (15-5) || Haren (14-6) || || 21,336 || 73-63
|- style="background-color:#ffbbbb"
| 137 || September 2 || @ Athletics || 8 – 7  || Street (4-2) || Bazardo (0-1) || || 23,195 || 73-64
|- style="background-color:#ffbbbb"
| 138 || September 4 || White Sox || 3 – 1 || Garland (9-10) || Bonderman (11-8) || Jenks (37) || 32,505 || 73-65
|- style="background-color:#bbffbb"
| 139 || September 5 || White Sox || 2 – 1  || Seay (2-0) || Phillips (0-1) || || 32,980 || 74-65
|- style="background-color:#bbffbb"
| 140 || September 6 || White Sox || 3 – 2 || Seay (3-0) || Jenks (3-5) || || 35,977 || 75-65
|- style="background-color:#bbffbb"
| 141 || September 7 || Mariners || 6 – 1 || Verlander (16-5) || Batista (13-11) || || 39,750 || 76-65
|- style="background-color:#bbffbb"
| 142 || September 8 || Mariners || 12 – 6 || Miner (3-3) || Weaver (6-12) || || 42,184 || 77-65
|- style="background-color:#ffbbbb"
| 143 || September 9 || Mariners || 14 – 7 || Hernández (12-7) || Bonderman (11-9) || || 39,990 || 77-66
|- style="background-color:#bbffbb"
| 144 || September 10 || Blue Jays || 5 – 4 || Bazardo (1-1) || Janssen (2-3) || || 35,689 || 78-66
|- style="background-color:#ffbbbb"
| 145 || September 11 || Rangers || 13 – 6 || Padilla (6-9) ||  Durbin (8-7) || || 32,719 || 78-67
|- style="background-color:#bbffbb"
| 146 || September 11 || Rangers || 4 – 1 || Jurrjens (2-1) || McCarthy (5-9) || Jones (34) || 33,840 || 79-67
|- style="background-color:#bbffbb"
| 147 || September 12 || Rangers || 5 – 1 || Verlander (17-5) || Vólquez (2-1) ||  || 32,490 || 80-67
|- style="background-color:#bbffbb"
| 148 || September 14 || @ Twins || 4 – 2 || Robertson (8-11) || Garza (3-6) || Jones (35)|| 22,282 || 81-67
|- style="background-color:#bbffbb"
| 149 || September 15 || @ Twins || 4 – 3 || Zumaya (2-3) || Santana (15-12) || Jones (36) || 35,230 || 82-67
|- style="background-color:#bbffbb"
| 150 || September 16 || @ Twins || 6 – 4 || Jurrjens (3-1) || Baker (9-8) || Jones (37) || 21,771  || 83-67
|- style="background-color:#ffbbbb"
| 151 || September 17 || @ Indians || 6 – 5  || Betancourt (5-1) || Miner (3-4) || || 28,825 || 83-68
|- style="background-color:#ffbbbb"
| 152 || September 18 || @ Indians || 7 – 4 || Lewis (1-1) || Verlander (17-6) || Borowski (41) || 41,103 || 83-69
|- style="background-color:#ffbbbb"
| 153 || September 19 || @ Indians || 4 – 2 || Sabathia (18-7) || Robertson (8-12) || Borowski (42) || 32,511 || 83-70
|- style="background-color:#bbffbb"
| 154 || September 21 || Royals || 5 – 4 || Byrdak (2-0) || Núñez (2-4) || Jones (38) || 40,117 || 84-70
|- style="background-color:#ffbbbb"
| 155 || September 22 || Royals || 7 – 4 || Davies (7-14) || Rogers (3-3) || || 41,792 || 84-71
|- style="background-color:#bbffbb"
| 156 || September 23 || Royals || 7 – 2 || Verlander (18-6) || de la Rosa (8-12) || || 40,068 || 85-71
|- style="background-color:#ffbbbb"
| 157 || September 24 || Twins || 2 – 0 || Silva (13-14) || Robertson (8-13) || Nathan (35) || 32,716 || 85-72
|- style="background-color:#bbffbb"
| 158 || September 25 || Twins || 8 – 0 || Bazardo (2-1) || Garza (4-7) || || 31,394 || 86-72
|- style="background-color:#bbffbb"
| 159 || September 26 || Twins || 9 – 4  || Byrdak (3-0) || Blackburn (0-1) || || 35,375 || 87-72
|- style="background-color:#ffbbbb"
| 160 || September 28 || @ White Sox || 5 – 2 || J. Vázquez (15-8) || Rogers (3-4) || Jenks (40) || 30,281 || 87-73
|- style="background-color:#ffbbbb"
| 161 || September 29 || @ White Sox || 3 – 2 || Wassermann (1-1) || Rodney (2-6) || || 33,066 || 87-74
|- style="background-color:#bbffbb"
| 162 || September 30 || @ White Sox || 13 – 3 || Robertson (9-13) || Contreras (10-17) || || 33,154 || 88-74

Player stats

Batting

Note: G = Games played; AB = At bats; H = Hits; Avg. = Batting average; HR = Home runs; RBI = Runs batted in

* Player released or traded. Stats only reflect games with Tigers.

Players in Bold qualify for batting title.

Pitching

Starting and other pitchers
Note: G = Games pitched; IP = Innings pitched; W = Wins; L = Losses; ERA = Earned run average; SO = Strikeouts

* Player released or traded.  Stats only reflect games with Tigers.

Relief pitchers
Note: G = Games pitched; W= Wins; L= Losses; SV = Saves; HLD = Holds; ERA = Earned run average; SO = Strikeouts

* Player released or traded.  Stats only reflect games with Tigers.

Farm system 

LEAGUE CHAMPIONS: West Michigan

References

Game Logs:
1st Half: Detroit Tigers Game Log on ESPN.com
2nd Half: Detroit Tigers Game Log on ESPN.com
Batting Statistics: Detroit Tigers Batting Stats on ESPN.com
Pitching Statistics: Detroit Tigers Pitching Stats on ESPN.com

2007 Detroit Tigers at Baseball Reference

Detroit Tigers seasons
Detroit Tigers season
2007 in sports in Michigan
2007 in Detroit